Shireoaks railway station serves the village of Shireoaks  in Nottinghamshire, England. It was opened by the Sheffield and Lincolnshire Junction Railway in 1849.

Facilities
The station is unstaffed and has no ticket provision - all tickets must be purchased prior to travel or on the train.  The main building that used to be located here has been demolished, though there are brick waiting shelters still standing on both platforms.  Train running information is offered via timetable posters, a help point on platform 1 and CIS screens.  Step-free access is available to both platforms via the level crossing at the eastern end.

Service
All services at Shireoaks are operated by Northern Trains using  and  DMUs.

The typical off-peak service in trains per hour is:
 1 tph to  via 
 1 tph to  via 

References

External links

Railway stations in Nottinghamshire
DfT Category F2 stations
Former Great Central Railway stations
Railway stations in Great Britain opened in 1849
Northern franchise railway stations
1849 establishments in England
Bassetlaw District